Admiral Curtis may refer to:

Berwick Curtis (1876–1965), British Royal Navy vice admiral
D.C. Curtis (born 1953), U.S. Navy vice admiral
Lucius Curtis (1786–1869), British Royal Navy admiral
Roger Curtis (1746–1816), British Royal Navy admiral

See also
Alban Curteis (1887–1961), British Royal Navy admiral